Broloppet (the Bridge Run) was a running event that took place on the Øresund Bridge between 2000 and 2006. The event was organized by MAI and Sparta Atletik. The first event took place on 12 June 2000. With over  entrants and  finishers it remains one of the largest running events ever held, and the world's largest half marathon ahead of Göteborgsvarvet and the Great North Run.

The first race, which was won by Ethiopian runner Tesfaye Tola only three months before he won the bronze medal at the 2000 Summer Olympics, started at the Danish end of the bridge on the island of Amager, continued through the tunnel under the artificial island of Peberholm, over the Öresund Bridge to the finish in Limhamn in Malmö. The competition was originally meant to be a one-time event to celebrate the opening of the Öresund Bridge, but it continued on for six more years until it ended in 2006.

On 12 June 2010 the race was revived as part of the 10th anniversary of the Øresund Bridge. The race distance was the same as the original.

Race results

Men
1. Tesfaye Tola, 59:51 
2. Philip Rugut, 1:00:00 
3. Phaustin Baha Sulle, 1:00:05 
4. Róbert Štefko, 1:00:29 
5. Gezahegne Abera, 1:00:30

Women
1. Restituta Joseph, 1:07:59 
2. Joyce Chepchumba, 1:08:18 
3. Lyubov Morgunova, 1:08:45 
4. Abeba Tola, 1:08:48 
5. Maria Guida, 1:09:00

References



Half marathons
Athletics competitions in Sweden
Recurring sporting events established in 2000
Sport in Malmö
Recurring sporting events disestablished in 2006
2000 establishments in Sweden
2006 disestablishments in Sweden